Edvaldo Esmael Ferreira (born 28 May 1990) is an Angolan handball player for Smouha Club Alexandria and the Angolan national team.

He participated at the 2017 World Men's Handball Championship.

References

1990 births
Living people
Angolan male handball players
Expatriate handball players
Angolan expatriate sportspeople in Egypt
Angolan expatriate sportspeople in Tunisia
African Games silver medalists for Angola
African Games medalists in handball
Competitors at the 2011 All-Africa Games
Competitors at the 2015 African Games